The appointment of Master Gunner, St James’s Park’s goes back to 1678 and has generally been held by a senior officer in the Royal Artillery.  The early incumbents (known then as the Master Gunner of Whitehall & St James's Park) were responsible for the artillery defence of Whitehall Palace and the Palace of Westminster.

There has always been a connection between the Monarch and the Regiment and it remains to this day with The King.  The Master Gunner, whose appointment is approved by Him, is the link to the Regiment.  He presides over regimental affairs by heading a Committee comprising serving and recently retired senior officers of the Regiment which provides guidance, advice and direction on all matters and affairs concerning the past, present and future of the Royal Regiment.  Along with his fellow Masters and Chiefs, he provides a report annually to the Chief of the General Staff on regimental affairs.  The Master Gunner also maintains the links to Commonwealth Royal Artilleries.

The Master Gunner St James’s Park should not be confused with that of the rank of Warrant Officer Class 1 (Master Gunner), which is a technical and instructional appointment achieved by some Royal Artillery warrant officers.

List of Master Gunners

Whitehall & St. James's Park

St. James's Park

References

Senior appointments of the British Army
Royal Artillery